The mine layer HNoMS Laugen was built for the Royal Norwegian Navy during World War I, as the lead ship of a two ship class. Her sister ship was Glommen.

She and her sister ship were kept in service until the German invasion of Norway in 1940. Laugen surrendered to the Germans on 14 April 1940, and like her sister ship was rebuilt as a floating anti-aircraft battery. She was returned to the Royal Norwegian Navy in 1945 and decommissioned in 1950.

Laugen was built at Akers mekaniske verksted in Kristiania. She was named after the river Lågen in southern Norway.

References

External links
 Naval history via FLIX: Glommen, retrieved 17 March 2006

Naval ships of Norway captured by Germany during World War II
Ships built in Oslo
Glommen-class minelayers
World War II minelayers of Norway
1918 ships